Wally Ingram is an American drummer and musician. He is most famous as a member of the band, Timbuk 3.

In recent years, he has toured with the multi-instrumentalist David Lindley, and released several records with him:
 2000 : Twango Bango Deluxe
 2001 : Twango Bango II
 2003 : Twango Bango III
 2004 : Live in Europe
In 1999 he was a member of 'The Sensitive Ones' (A name coined by Bruce Springsteen) Tour.

After being diagnosed with cancer, Ingram played in a January 2007 benefit concert staged by Butch Vig and Bonnie Raitt on his behalf. Other participants included Sheryl Crow, Jackson Browne, Crowded House, and George Clinton.

As of February 2014, Ingram is the new drummer in German singer/songwriter Stefan Stoppok's band and working on their next album in Hamburg, Germany.

In 2018, Ingram played with Bob Weir and Phil Lesh as part of the pair's "Duo Tour".

References

External links
Ingram's own official website

n

American drummers
Living people
People from Beloit, Wisconsin
Year of birth missing (living people)
Stockholm Syndrome (band) members
Timbuk3 members